Events from the year 1827 in Canada.

Incumbents
Monarch: George IV

Federal government
Parliament of Lower Canada: 12th (until July 5), 13th (starting November 20)
Parliament of Upper Canada: 9th

Governors
Governor of the Canadas: Robert Milnes
Governor of New Brunswick: George Stracey Smyth
Governor of Nova Scotia: John Coape Sherbrooke
Civil Governor of Newfoundland: Thomas John Cochrane
Governor of Prince Edward Island: Charles Douglass Smith

Events
March 15 – The University of Toronto is chartered
First temperance society in Canada formed in Montreal
Elections overwhelmingly in favour of the Parti Patriote much to the annoyance of the British.
87,000 people in Lower Canada sign a petition denouncing the political abuses of the Château Clique.

Births
January 3 – Letitia Youmans, temperance advocate (died 1896)
January 7 – Sandford Fleming, engineer and inventor (died 1915)
February 28 – Albert Lacombe, missionary (died 1916)
April 16 – Octave Crémazie, poet (died 1879)
August 22 – Ezra Butler Eddy, businessman
October 21 – Charles Laberge, lawyer, journalist and politician (died 1874)
November 17 – William Evan Price, businessman and politician (died 1880)
December 27 – Pierre-Alexis Tremblay, politician (died 1879)

Deaths
 August 31 – Jean Boudreau, politician

References 

 
Canada
Years of the 19th century in Canada
1827 in North America